Erick Alexandro Torres Leyva (born 16 February 2001) is a Peruvian footballer who plays as a winger for Peruvian Segunda División side Comerciantes Unidos.

Career

Club career
Torres got his professional debut for Carlos A. Mannucci in the Peruvian Primera División on 14 April 2019 against Alianza Universidad. Torres was in the starting lineup but was replaced by Relly Fernández after 51 minutes. His second appearances came 13 days later against Sport Huancayo.

In the summer 2021, Torres joined Deportivo Llacuabamba. In February 2022, Torres moved to fellow league club Comerciantes Unidos.

References

External links
 
 

Living people
2001 births
Association football wingers
Peruvian footballers
Peruvian Primera División players
Peruvian Segunda División players
Carlos A. Mannucci players
Comerciantes Unidos footballers
People from Trujillo, Peru